HMS Concord was a  destroyer of the Royal Navy.

She was initially ordered as Corso during the Second World War, and was built by John I. Thornycroft & Company, Southampton. She was launched on 14 May 1945, renamed Concord in June 1946 and commissioned on 20 December 1946.

Operational service
Concord served in the Far East between 1947 and 1957 as part of the 8th Destroyer Squadron. In 1949, she was involved in the Amethyst Incident. Concord entered the River Yangtze and proceeded to a point off the Woosung Fort, the location of a heavy gun battery  from the mouth of the river. Lieutenant Commander Kerans, commanding the sloop , had from the beginning requested that Concord should meet him there to give protection at the most critical point of his escape. Concord provided sailors to fill out the thinned ranks aboard Amethyst and the two ships made their way downriver There was no boom at the mouth of the river. After handing over the escort of Amethyst to other vessels, Concord was ordered to Japan. Concord went on to serve during the Korean War.

Decommissioning and disposal
Concord was withdrawn from active service in 1957. Following her sale Concord arrived at the breakers yard of Thos. W. Ward at Inverkeithing on 22 October 1962.

References

Publications
 
 
 
 

 

Korean War destroyers of the United Kingdom
1945 ships
C-class destroyers (1943) of the Royal Navy
Ships built by John I. Thornycroft & Company